The eight members of the South Australian Railways U class were the first narrow-gauge  locomotives on the South Australian Railways and the first of many steam locomotives built by Beyer, Peacock and Company for the railway. They entered service in 1876: four on the Port Wakefield to Hoyleton line and four on the Port Pirie to Crystal Brook line. Subsequently they operated on the Port Wakefield, Port Pirie and Port Augusta lines.

In addition to their SAR operations, several were used by contractors at various times on extending the narrow gauge lines into the hinterland. Their role on main lines did not last long, because of shortcomings in the valve gear and pony truck designs; locomotives of the long-lived W class entered service two years later, after which the U class locomotives were deployed on shunting and further railway construction. In 1915, with the Thevenard gypsum line open and resources no doubt stretched, three were sent to the isolated Port Lincoln Division for three years until the first of the Y class arrived. Their working lives variously lasted 28 years (three locos), 48–53 (four) and 79 (one).

References

U
3 ft 6 in gauge locomotives of Australia
Beyer, Peacock locomotives
2-6-0 locomotives
Railway locomotives introduced in 1876